Appu Pattanshetty is an Indian politician and former member of the legislative assembly of the state of Karnataka. He is a member of the Bharatiya Janata Party. He was elected for two consecutive terms in 2004 and 2008 from the Bijapur constituency of the Karnataka Legislative Assembly.

References 

Living people
Karnataka MLAs 2004–2007
Bharatiya Janata Party politicians from Karnataka
People from Bijapur, Karnataka
Year of birth missing (living people)
Karnataka MLAs 2008–2013